Myra Miller (1811-1891) was a famous Black food entrepreneur and baker in Atlanta during Reconstruction.

Miller was born in Virginia in 1811. She was a slave and was sold as a cook to someone in Rome, Georgia.  In 1871, she moved with her husband to Atlanta and started a bakery. Miller's bakery was well known in Atlanta and her wedding fruitcakes were sent across the country. Miller died in 1891 and was buried in the African American section of  Oakland Cemetery.

References 

1811 births
1891 deaths
African-American people
African-American women
African-American women in business
19th-century African-American women
Burials at Oakland Cemetery (Atlanta)